Katangi Assembly constituency is one of the 230 Vidhan Sabha (Legislative Assembly) constituencies of Madhya Pradesh state in central India.

It is part of Balaghat District. The current MLA is Tamlal Sahare (INC).

Members of the Legislative Assembly

See also
 Katangi

References

Assembly constituencies of Madhya Pradesh